The men's 5000 metres long distance event at the 1960 Olympic Games took place between August 31 and September 2.

Results

Heats

The fastest three runners in each of the four heats advanced to the final round.

Heat one

Heat two

Heat three

Heat four

Final

Key: DNF = did not finish

References

Athletics at the 1960 Summer Olympics
5000 metres at the Olympics
Men's events at the 1960 Summer Olympics